Collin Altamirano (born December 7, 1995) is an American professional tennis player.

Altamirano won the 2013 USTA Boys 18 National Championship as an unseeded player, the first ever to do so, defeating Jared Donaldson 6–1, 6–2, 6–4 in the final. This earned him a wild card entry into the 2013 U.S. Open where he lost to 22-seed Philipp Kohlschreiber of Germany in the first round. Prior to the 2013 U.S. Open, Altamirano had only played in six professional-level matches, all at the ITF Men's Circuit level (commonly referred to as Futures), and had lost all six.

Gear
Altamirano currently plays with the Wilson Blade racquet and Solinco Tour Bite strings, wearing Babolat Propulse 4 shoes.

Tournaments
2013 USTA Boys' 18 Champion - Kalamazoo, MI - USTA Nationals: Collin Altamirano becomes first unseeded player to win singles title
2013 US Open – Boys' singles – Lost in quarterfinals to #1 seeded Alexander Zverev of Germany. Collin was the only American in the Junior Boys' Quarterfinals.
2013 US Open – Men's singles – Lost in first round to Philipp Kohlschreiber
2018 US Open – Men's singles – Lost in first round to Ugo Humbert

ATP Challenger and ITF Futures finals

Singles: 4 (3–1)

References

External links
 
 

American male tennis players
Tennis people from California
Virginia Cavaliers men's tennis players
1995 births
Living people